Saint-Joseph-de-Sorel is a town in the Regional county municipality of Pierre-De Saurel, in Montérégie, Quebec. It is located north of the Tracy section of Sorel-Tracy. Champlain Street marks the town's southern  limit from Sorel-Tracy, and the rest of the town is surrounded by water (either Saint Lawrence River or Richelieu River).

As it is the case with neighboring municipalities, metallurgy plays a significant role in the town's economy. The Sorel-Tracy based QIT et Titane has a facility which occupies the western part of the town, while the eastern part of the town is essentially home to the Les Forges de Sorel company. This leaves the central part as the only portion of the town that is fully residential.
 
The population of Saint-Joseph-de-Sorel was 1,677 as of the Canada 2011 Census.

Demographics 

Population trend:

Mother tongue language (2016)

See also
List of cities in Quebec

References

1907 establishments in Quebec
Cities and towns in Quebec
Incorporated places in Pierre-De Saurel Regional County Municipality
Quebec populated places on the Saint Lawrence River
Populated places established in 1907